Coprophanaeus pluto is a species of dung beetle in the family Scarabaeidae. It is found in Central America.

References

Further reading

 
 

Scarabaeinae
Articles created by Qbugbot
Beetles described in 1863